Scaptesyle dictyota is a moth in the subfamily Arctiinae. It was described by Edward Meyrick in 1886. It is found in Queensland, Australia.

References

Moths described in 1886
Lithosiini